Muhammad Ibn at-Tayib ar-Rudani was a Moroccan qadi who brought the first Arabic printing press to Morocco in 1864. He came from a learned family from Taroudant.

Press 
He brought the printing press back from Egypt when he traveled to the Mashreq to perform the Hajj. The press arrived at the port of Essaouira in 1864. It was named al-matba'a as-sa'ida ( 'the felicitous printing press'). The first work it published was an edition of Al-Tirmidhi's 9th century hadith collection Ash-Shama'il al-Muhammadiyya.

References 

Moroccan judges
Publishers (people)
People from Taroudannt